Sandro Carrara (May 17, 1964) is a Swiss scientist, professor at the Swiss Federal Institute of Technology EPFL, in Lausanne, Switzerland. He is a Fellow of the Institute of Electrical and Electronics Engineers (IEEE) and he is mainly known for his pioneering work in the emerging area of co-design of bio/nano/CMOS interfaces as well as for his contributions to the design of nanoscale biological CMOS sensors. He is now the Editor-in-Chief of the IEEE Sensors Journal, one of the largest among more than 200 IEEE publications.

Life
Carrara studied electronics at the Institute of Technology in Albenga, Italy, physics at the University of Genoa, Italy, and received a PhD from the University of Padua, Italy in 1998. He held a postdoctoral position at the University of Genoa, where he then became research associate and professor of optical and electrical biosensors at the Department of Electrical Engineering and Biophysics (DIBE). He was also professor of nanobiotechnology at University of Bologna (Italy), before joining EPFL in Lausanne, Switzerland, in 2007.

Scientific contribution
Major achievements of Carrara and his group are in the fields of electrochemical biosensors, bioelectronics, and circuits and systems, especially to investigate new methods and devices for biomedical applications in remote monitoring of human metabolism, drug monitoring, personalized medicine, and precision medicine. He also made fundamental contributions in the field of biomolecular memristor.

Awards
 Fellow of the Institute of Electrical and Electronics Engineers (IEEE) in 2016
 IEEE Sensors Council Technical Achievement Award

References

External links
 Sandro Carrara's EPFL Official page
 IEEE Sensors Council Leaders
 IEEE Sensors Journal
 Sandro Carrara citations on GoogleSchoolar

Fellow Members of the IEEE
Living people
Swiss engineers
1964 births